is a railway station on the Jōetsu Line in the town of Yuzawa, Minamiuonuma District, Niigata Prefecture, Japan, operated by the East Japan Railway Company (JR East).

Lines

Station layout
The station has two ground-level opposed side platforms connected by a footbridge. The station is unattended.

Platforms

History
Tsuchitaru Station began passenger operations on 8 December 1933 as a temporary station open during the ski season. It began permanent operations from 10 January 1941. Upon the privatization of the Japanese National Railways (JNR) on 1 April 1987, it came under the control of JR East.

Surrounding area
Tsuchitaru Hydroelectric Power Station

See also
 List of railway stations in Japan

External links

 JR East station information 

Railway stations in Niigata Prefecture
Railway stations in Japan opened in 1933
Stations of East Japan Railway Company
Jōetsu Line
Yuzawa, Niigata